This is a list of player transfers involving Pro14 teams before or during the 2017–18 season.

Benetton

Players In 
  Sebastian Negri from  Hartpury College
  Juan Ignacio Brex from  Viadana
  Andrea Bronzini from  Viadana
  Marty Banks from  Highlanders
  Federico Ruzza from  Zebre
  Nasi Manu from  Edinburgh
  Whetu Douglas from  Crusaders
  Marco Riccioni from  Calvisano
  Irné Herbst from  Southern Kings
  Engjel Makelara from  Petrarca
  Tomás Baravalle from  Jockey 
  Hame Faiva from  Waikato
  Monty Ioane from  Bay of Planty Steamers

Players Out

  Roberto Santamaria to  Petrarca
  Guglielmo Zanini to  Rovigo Delta
  Luke McLean to  London Irish
  Filo Paulo to  London Irish
  Filippo Gerosa to  Petrarca
  Andrea Pratichetti to  Amatori San Donà
  David Odiete to  Rovigo Delta
  Davide Giazzon to  Mogliano
  Jean-François Montauriol to  I Medicei Firenze
  Alberto Rolando Porolli to  Newman
  Andrea Buondonno to  Mogliano

Cardiff Blues

Players In
  Jack Roberts from  Leicester Tigers
  Damian Welch from  Exeter Chiefs
  Sion Bennett from  Northampton Saints
  Olly Robinson from  Bristol (short-term loan subsequently made permanent.)

Players Out
  Cory Allen to  Ospreys
  Jarrad Hoeata to  North Harbour
  Marc Thomas to  Yorkshire Carnegie
  Liam Belcher to  Dragons
  Franco van der Merwe to  London Irish
  Cam Dolan released
  Pele Cowley released
  Scott Andrews to  Bath (one-month loan)

Cheetahs

Players In
  Cecil Afrika from  South Africa Sevens (loan)
  Rynier Bernardo from  Scarlets
  Luan de Bruin from 
  Erich de Jager from 
  Johan Goosen unattached
  Lloyd Greeff from 
  Malcolm Jaer from  Southern Kings
  Günther Janse van Vuuren from 
  Johan Kotze from 
  Tertius Kruger from 
  Daniel Maartens from 
  Makazole Mapimpi from  Southern Kings
  Rabz Maxwane from 
  Gerhard Olivier from 
  Robbie Petzer from 
  JP Smith from 
  Rosko Specman from  South Africa Sevens (loan)
  Ernst Stapelberg from 
  Ntokozo Vidima from 
  Jasper Wiese from 
  Lihleli Xoli from

Players Out
The Cheetahs joined the Pro14 for the 2017–18 season. For player departures prior to this season, see List of 2017–18 Super Rugby transfers#Cheetahs. The transfers below occurred during the season:

  Cecil Afrika to  South Africa Sevens (loan return)
  Rayno Benjamin released
  Chris Dry to  South Africa Sevens (loan return)
  Armandt Koster to 
  Hilton Lobberts to 
  Makazole Mapimpi to 
  Sergeal Petersen to 
  Robbie Petzer to 
  Raymond Rhule to 
  JP Smith to  Southern Kings
  Rosko Specman to  South Africa Sevens (loan return)

Connacht

Players In
  Gavin Thornbury from  Wanganui
  Cormac Brennan promoted from Academy
  Conor McKeon promoted from Academy
  Pat O'Toole promoted from Academy
  James Mitchell from  Sale Sharks
  Peter McCabe from  Munster
  Jarrad Butler from  Brumbies
  Andrew Deegan from  Waratahs
  Rory Scholes from  Edinburgh
  Denis Coulson from  Grenoble
  Pita Ahki from

Players Out
  John Cooney to  Ulster
  Ben Marshall retired
  Danny Qualter to  Nottingham
  Ciaran Gaffney to  Zebre
  Rory Moloney to  Thames Valley
  Shane O'Leary to  Ealing Trailfinders
  Rory Parata to  Otago
  Nepia Fox-Matamua to  Ponsonby
  Ronan Loughney retired
  Danie Poolman to  Buccaneers
  Josh Rowland to  Ireland Sevens
  Ivan Soroka to  Clontarf
  Lewis Stevenson to  Bangor
  Marnitz Boshoff to  Blue Bulls

Dragons

Players In
  Zane Kirchner from  Leinster
  Gavin Henson from  Bristol
  Liam Belcher from  Cardiff Blues
  Gerard Ellis from  London Irish
  Dan Suter from  Ospreys
  Thretton Palamo from  Bristol (short-term loan)
 Calvin Wellington from  St Helens
  Jarryd Sage from  Southern Kings
  Nicky Thomas from  Scarlets (short-term loan)

Players Out
  Shaun Knight to  Bath
  Tom Prydie to  Scarlets
  Geraint Rhys Jones to  Scarlets
  Nick Crosswell to  Manawatu 
  T. Rhys Thomas retired
  Darran Harris to  Merthyr
  Craig Mitchell released

Edinburgh

Players In
  Mark Bennett from  Glasgow Warriors
  Murray McCallum promoted from Academy
  Callum Hunter-Hill promoted from Academy
  Ally Miller promoted from Academy
  Hugh Fraser promoted from Academy
  Tom Galbraith promoted from Academy
  Darcy Graham promoted from Academy
  Robbie Fruean from  Bath
  Duhan van der Merwe from  Montpellier
  Jason Harries from  London Scottish
  Darryl Marfo from  Bath
  Cameron Fenton from  Glasgow Hawks

Players Out
  Jack Cosgrove to  Bristol
  Nasi Manu to  Benetton
  Michael Allen retired
  Sasa Tofilau to  Massy
  Will Helu to  Timișoara Saracens
  George Turner to  Glasgow Warriors (season-loan)
  Rory Scholes to  Connacht
  Nick Beavon to  Melrose
  Kyle Whyte to  Watsonians 
  Jake Kerr to  Leicester Tigers
 Anton Bresler to  Worcester Warriors
  Alex Northam released
  Viliami Fihaki released

Glasgow Warriors

Players In
  Lewis Wynne promoted from Academy
  Matt Smith promoted from Academy
  Huw Jones from  Stormers
  Oli Kebble from  Stormers
  Callum Gibbins from  Hurricanes
  Jamie Bhatti promoted from Academy
  Adam Hastings from  Bath
  George Horne promoted from Academy
  Paddy Kelly promoted from Academy
  Lelia Masaga from  Chiefs
  Samuela Vunisa from  Saracens
  Kiran McDonald from  Hull
  Brandon Thomson from  Stormers
  Siosiua Halanukonuka from  Highlanders
  Ruaridh Jackson from  Harlequins
  George Turner from  Edinburgh (season-loan)
  Nikola Matawalu from  Exeter Chiefs
  Ryan Grant from  Worcester Warriors

Players Out
  Sila Puafisi to  Brive
  Mark Bennett to  Edinburgh
  Rory Clegg to  Ealing Trailfinders
  Josh Strauss to  Sale Sharks
  Gordon Reid to  London Irish
  Sean Lamont retired
  Grayson Hart to  Ealing Trailfinders
  Junior Bulumakau to  Doncaster Knights
  Peter Murchie retired
  Tijuee Uanivi to  London Scottish
  Fraser Lyle to  London Scottish
  Hagen Schulte to  Heidelberger RK
  Nemia Kenatale released

Leinster

Players In
  Scott Fardy from  Brumbies
  James Lowe from  Chiefs
  Andrew Porter promoted from Academy
  Ross Byrne promoted from Academy
  Joey Carbery promoted from Academy
  Nick McCarthy promoted from Academy
  Rory O'Loughlin promoted from Academy
  Peadar Timmins promoted from Academy
  James Ryan promoted from Academy

Players Out
  Zane Kirchner to  Dragons
  Mike Ross retired
  Hayden Triggs retired
  Mike McCarthy retired
  Dominic Ryan to  Leicester Tigers
 Jeremy Loughman to  Munster (loan)

Munster

Players In
  Chris Farrell from  Grenoble
  JJ Hanrahan from  Northampton Saints
  James Hart from  Racing 92
  Brian Scott promoted from Academy
  Conor Oliver promoted from Academy
  Bill Johnston promoted from Academy
  Dan Goggin promoted from Academy
  Stephen Fitzgerald promoted from Academy
  Chris Cloete from  Southern Kings/Pumas
  Gerbrandt Grobler from  Racing 92
  Ciaran Parker from  Sale Sharks
  Mark Flanagan from  Saracens (three-month loan)
 Jeremy Loughman from  Leinster (three-month loan)

Players Out
  Dave Foley to  Pau
  Cian Bohane retired
  Rory Burke to  Nottingham
  Mark Chisholm retired
  Donnacha Ryan to  Racing 92
  John Madigan to  Massy
  Peter McCabe to  Connacht
  Francis Saili to  Harlequins

Ospreys

Players In
  James Hook from  Gloucester
  Cory Allen from  Cardiff Blues
  Brian Mujati from  Sale Sharks
  Sam Cross from  Wales Sevens
  Guy Mercer from  Bath (season-loan)

Players Out
  Sam Underhill to  Bath
  Tom O'Flaherty to  Exeter Chiefs
  Josh Matavesi to  Newcastle Falcons
  Joe Bearman to  Merthyr
  Jonathan Spratt retired
  Tyler Ardron to  Chiefs
  Tom Grabham to  Scarlets
  Dan Suter to  Dragons

Scarlets

Players In
  Paul Asquith from  Greater Sydney Rams
  Tom Prydie from  Dragons
  Geraint Rhys Jones from  Dragons
  Tom Grabham from  Ospreys
  Morgan Williams from  Wales Sevens
  Leigh Halfpenny from  Toulon
  Steve Cummins from  Melbourne Rebels

Players Out
  Liam Williams to  Saracens
  D. T. H. van der Merwe to  Newcastle Falcons
  Peter Edwards to  Merthyr
  Richard Smith to  Neath
  Aled Thomas retired
  Morgan Allen to  Bedwas
  Gareth Owen to  Leicester Tigers
  Matthew Owen to  Carmarthen Quins
  Rynier Bernardo to  Cheetahs
  Nicky Thomas to  Dragons (short-term loan)

Southern Kings

Players In
  Lusanda Badiyana from 
  Eital Bredenkamp from 
  Tienie Burger from 
  Stephan Coetzee from 
  Kurt Coleman from 
  Rossouw de Klerk from 
  Bobby de Wee from 
  Martin du Toit from 
  Martin Dreyer from 
  Rowan Gouws from 
  Stephan Greeff from 
  Njabulo Gumede from 
  Harlon Klaasen from 
  Khaya Majola from 
  Michael Makase from 
  Godlen Masimla from 
  Siya Mdaka from 
  Jacques Nel from 
  Freddy Ngoza from 
  Luvuyo Pupuma from 
  JC Roos from  Canon Eagles
  Jarryd Sage from 
  Pieter Scholtz from 
  Victor Sekekete from 
  S'bura Sithole from 
  Joe Smith from 
  JP Smith from 
  Piet-Louw Strauss from 
  Entienne Swanepoel from 
  Alandré van Rooyen from 
  Dries van Schalkwyk from  Zebre
  Jurie van Vuuren from 
  Anthony Volmink from 
  Lindokuhle Welemu from 
  Oliver Zono from

Players Out
The Kings joined the Pro14 for the 2017–18 season. For player departures prior to this season, see List of 2017–18 Super Rugby transfers#Kings. The transfers below occurred during the season:

  Pieter-Steyn de Wet to 
  Jarryd Sage to  Dragons

Ulster

Players In
  John Cooney from  Connacht
  Schalk van der Merwe from  Southern Kings
  Jean Deysel from  Sharks
  David Busby promoted from Academy
  Aaron Cairns promoted from Academy
  Ross Kane promoted from Academy
  Rob Lyttle promoted from Academy
  Tommy O'Hagan promoted from Academy
  Jack Owens promoted from Academy
  Christian Lealiifano from  Brumbies

Players Out
  Roger Wilson retired
  Conor Joyce to  Jersey Reds
  Mark Best to  Jersey Reds
  Jonny Murphy to  Rotherham Titans
  Ruan Pienaar to  Montpellier
  John Donnan released 
  Lorcan Dow released 
  Ricky Lutton released 
  Stephen Mulholland released

Zebre

Players In
  Roberto Tenga from  Fiamme Oro
  Renato Giammarioli from  Calvisano
  Matteo Minozzi from  Calvisano
  Luhandre Luus from  Calvisano
  Sami Panico from  Calvisano
  Maicol Azzolini from  Fiamme Oro
  Leonard Krumov from  Viadana
  Riccardo Raffaele from  Calvisano
  Dave Sisi from  Bath
  Ciaran Gaffney from  Connacht
  Eduardo Bello from  Atlético de Rosario
  Cruze Ah-Nau from  Melbourne Rebels
  James Tucker from  Waikato
 Edoardo Padovani from  Toulon
  Rory Parata from  Otago

Players Out
  Quintin Geldenhuys retired
  Federico Ruzza to  Benetton
  Pietro Ceccarelli to  Oyonnax
  Edoardo Padovani to  Toulon
  Joshua Furno to  Otago
  Kayle van Zyl to  Amatori San Donà
  Guillermo Roan to  La Plata
  Lloyd Greeff to  Free State Cheetahs
  Dries van Schalkwyk to  Southern Kings
  Kurt Baker to  Manawatu
  Gideon Koegelenberg to 
  Bart le Roux to 
 Bruno Postiglioni to  Gernika
 Sidney Tobias to  Rustenburg Impala
  Dion Berryman released 
  Carlo Engelbrecht released

See also
 List of 2017–18 Premiership Rugby transfers
 List of 2017–18 RFU Championship transfers
 List of 2017–18 Super Rugby transfers
 List of 2017–18 Top 14 transfers

References

2017–18 Pro14
2017-18